Danielle 'Dani' Rowe MBE (née King; born 21 November 1990) is a British former road and track cyclist. She retired from cycling in December 2018.

A team pursuit gold medallist from the London Olympics in 2012, Rowe also won three consecutive world titles in the women's team pursuit, winning in 2011, (with Laura Trott and Wendy Houvenaghel), 2012 (with Trott and Joanna Rowsell), and 2013 (with Trott and Elinor Barker).

Career
She won the team pursuit at the Track Cycling World Cup in London in preparation for the Olympics in February 2012. At the 2012 Summer Olympics, Rowe won a gold medal for the team pursuit alongside Laura Trott and Joanna Rowsell. The team also set a new world record time of 3:14.051 in this event.

In November 2014, Rowe was involved a serious crash after hitting a pothole while training on roads near Merthyr Tydfil. She suffered a snapped rib cage and a collapsed lung and spent 10 days in hospital.

Rowe was appointed a Member of the Order of the British Empire (MBE) in the 2013 New Year Honours for services to cycling.

She was given the Freedom of the Borough of Eastleigh in 2013, where a cycle route in Hamble is also named after her.

After one year, in October 2017 she announced that she would join  for 2018.

Personal life
Rowe went to school at Hamble Community Sports College before attending Barton Peveril Sixth Form College. Her father, Trevor King, is a former biathlete who competed in two Winter Olympics. She has a younger sister. Initially a keen competitive swimmer for her school and triathlete, with Chapel Tri-Stars junior triathlon club, in 2005 she was tested by the British Cycling at her School and was then selected to join the Talent Team, which was at that time part of British Cycling's Rider Route. Later that year she joined i-Team.cc cycling club where she trained and raced regularly at The Mountbatten Centre Velodrome in Portsmouth. In 2009, she came down with glandular fever whilst training to become an elite cyclist, leading to worries about her career being over. She recovered, however, and was later chosen to compete at world champion level in late 2011 and after setting world record with her pursuit team-mates she was chosen for Team GB.

Rowe is married to fellow cyclist Matthew Rowe. They married on Saturday 30 September 2017 at Llandaff Cathedral and their reception overlooked the Severn Estuary at a country house in Chepstow. The couple live in Cardiff, Wales. In 2020, Rowe gave birth to a son.

Major results

Track

2006
 National Youth Track Championships
2nd Individual pursuit
3rd Scratch
2008
 2nd Scratch, National Junior Track Championships
2009
 National Track Championships
1st  Derny
1st  Madison (with Alex Greenfield)
3rd Individual pursuit
3rd Points race
3rd Scratch
2010
 National Track Championships
1st  Team pursuit
2nd Derny
2nd Madison
2nd Points race
3rd Scratch
2011
 UCI Track World Championships
1st  Team pursuit
3rd  Scratch
 1st  Team pursuit, UEC European Track Championships
 UEC European Under-23 Track Championships
1st  Team pursuit (with Katie Colclough and Laura Trott)
2nd  Omnium
 National Track Championships
1st  Team pursuit
3rd Scratch
 2nd  Omnium, 2011–12 UCI Track Cycling World Cup, Astana
2012
 1st  Team pursuit, Olympic Games
 1st  Team pursuit, UCI Track World Championships
 1st  Team pursuit, 2011–12 UCI Track Cycling World Cup, London
 1st  Team pursuit, 2012–13 UCI Track Cycling World Cup, Glasgow
2013
 1st  Team pursuit, UCI Track World Championships
 Team pursuit, 2013–14 UCI Track Cycling World Cup
1st  Manchester
1st  Aguascalientes
 UEC European Track Championships
1st  Team pursuit
2nd  Points race
 National Track Championships
1st  Madison (with Laura Trott)
1st  Team pursuit
2nd Individual pursuit
2nd Points race
3rd Scratch
 1st Points race, Revolution – Round 1, Manchester
2014
 National Track Championships
1st  Team pursuit
3rd Scratch
 Revolution
2nd Scratch – Round 4, Manchester
3rd Points race – Round 4, Manchester
3rd Scratch – Round 3, Manchester
2017
 3rd Points race, Revolution Series – Champions League

Road

2009
 1st  Criterium, National Road Championships
2011
 2nd Criterium, National Road Championships
2013
 1st Milk Race
 3rd Road race, National Road Championships
2014
 2nd Road race, National Road Championships
 3rd Overall Surf & Turf 2-Day Women's Stage Race
2015
 1st  Overall Tour of the Reservoir
1st Stage 1
 1st Bath, Matrix Fitness Grand Prix Series
 10th Gooik–Geraardsbergen–Gooik
2016
 1st Red Hook Crit
 3rd Cadel Evans Great Ocean Road Race
 4th Road race, National Road Championships
 4th Overall Women's Tour Down Under
1st Mountains classification
 5th Crescent Vårgårda UCI Women's WorldTour TTT
 7th Philadelphia Cycling Classic
 9th Overall La Route de France
2017
 9th Overall The Women's Tour
 9th Omloop Het Nieuwsblad
 9th GP de Plouay – Bretagne
 10th Women's Tour de Yorkshire
2018
 2nd Road race, National Road Championships
 2nd Overall Women's Tour de Yorkshire
 3rd  Road race, Commonwealth Games
 3rd Overall The Women's Tour
1st  British rider classification
 10th Road race, UEC European Road Championships

See also
 2012 Summer Olympics and Paralympics gold post boxes

References

External links

 
 
 
 
 
 
 
 
 

1990 births
Living people
English female cyclists
English track cyclists
English Olympic medallists
UCI Track Cycling World Champions (women)
Olympic cyclists of Great Britain
Olympic gold medallists for Great Britain
Olympic medalists in cycling
Cyclists at the 2012 Summer Olympics
Medalists at the 2012 Summer Olympics
Commonwealth Games competitors for England
Commonwealth Games medallists in cycling
Commonwealth Games bronze medallists for Wales
Cyclists at the 2014 Commonwealth Games
Cyclists at the 2018 Commonwealth Games
Members of the Order of the British Empire
Sportspeople from Southampton
Medallists at the 2018 Commonwealth Games